Dennis Nicolson Nelson (born 25 February 1950) is a Scottish former professional footballer who played in the Scottish League and the English Football League as a forward or midfielder.

References

1950 births
Living people
Footballers from Edinburgh
Scottish footballers
Association football forwards
Broxburn Athletic F.C. players
Hibernian F.C. players
Dunfermline Athletic F.C. players
Crewe Alexandra F.C. players
Reading F.C. players
Stafford Rangers F.C. players
Scottish Football League players
English Football League players
National League (English football) players